Bertram Harry Crellin (27 May 1902 – 15 April 1993) was an Australian rules footballer who played with Footscray in the Victorian Football League (VFL).

Crellin was a mainstay at the Williamstown Football Club for much of the 1920s.  From 1922-1929 he filled roles in the backline for Williamstown and was often a standout player.  Like many men of the time, the great depression of 1929 saw Crellin seek employment in a regional area.  He temporarily relocated to Bendigo at that time and played for the local Kangaroo Flat Football Club.

Notes

External links 
		

1902 births
1993 deaths
Australian rules footballers from Victoria (Australia)
Western Bulldogs players